Giorgio Frassineti (29 September 1964 in Forlì) is an Italian politician of the Partito Democratico (PD) and from 2009 to 2019 mayor of Predappio.

Early life 

In 1990, Frassineti completed his study in geography at University of Bologna.

Career 

In June 2009, he took over the office of mayor of the municipality of Predappio with a center-left coalition. The village of 6,000 inhabitants in the Italian region of Emilia-Romagna is most widely known as the birthplace of Mussolini.

Because of Predappio's historical significance, it was of particular concern to Frassineti to preserve buildings from the 20th century. Frassineti developed the idea of an international documentation centre of the 20th century.

Since 2019, when he lost his place as Predappio's mayor, he is a teacher of Geography and Natural science in Forlì's school specialized in Aeronautics.

Documentation Centre of the 20th century 

The documentation centre was planned to house a permanent exhibition in a space of 1000 square meters to be developed by Italian and international historians under the supervision of the Parri Institute from Bologna. In addition, space would be left for other projects that allow a critical and objective examination of the time period and at the same time cause a "learning from the past".
  
The project planned to cooperate with the House of Responsibility for Adolf Hitler's birthplace in Braunau am Inn. Among others, the documentation center could receive an Austrian Holocaust Memorial Servant.
 
In September 2011, Frassineti followed an invitation from Andreas Maislinger and Oscar-winner Branko Lustig to participate in the 20. Braunauer Zeitgeschichte-Tage titled "Difficult Heritage". On 19 July 2016, the district council of Predappio officially gave the Parri Institute permission to proceed with the documentation centre. Costs were estimated to be 3,000,000 euros of which 2,000,000 euros will be provided by the region of Emilia-Romagna from the European Union Structural Fund.

Awards 
 2016 Austrian Holocaust Memorial Award

References

External links 
 Spirit of Benito Mussolini is revived amid fears of right-wing march to power. The Times. September 27, 2008.
 Mussolini's Italian hometown plans fascism museum. CNN. February 17, 2016.
 Mussolini's shrine town will get €5m fascism museum. The Local. April 16, 2016.
 Inside the Mussolini Museum. The Daily Beast. April 26, 2015.
 History of fascism museum to open in Mussolini’s town. The Independent. April 25, 2014.
 Mussolini's birthplace in Italy to get a fascist museum. UPI. April 23, 2014.
 A Dead Dictator Who Draws Tens of Thousands in Italy. The New York Times. November 2, 2011.

1964 births
Living people
Anti-fascism in Italy
Democratic Party (Italy) politicians
Mayors of places in Emilia-Romagna
University of Bologna alumni